The 1977 Cologne Cup, also known as the Cologne Grand Prix, was a men's tennis tournament played on indoor carpet courts in Cologne, West Germany that was part of the 1977 Colgate-Palmolive Grand Prix circuit and categorized as a One Star event. It was the second edition of the tournament and was held from 31 October through 6 November 1977. First-seeded Björn Borg won the singles title and the accompanying $10,000 first-prize money

Finals

Singles
 Björn Borg defeated  Wojciech Fibak 2–6, 7–5, 6–3
 It was Borg's 11th singles title of the year and the 31st of his career.

Doubles
 Bob Hewitt /  Frew McMillan defeated  Fred McNair /  Sherwood Stewart 6–3, 7–5

References

External links
 ITF tournament edition details

Cologne Cup
Cologne Cup